The Santa Cova Funicular is a funicular railway at Montserrat, near Barcelona in Catalonia, Spain. The line descends from the monastery, and the upper terminus of the Montserrat Rack Railway, on a continuous curve to a lower station that gives access, via a path, to Santa Cova, a shrine lower down the mountain.

The funicular has the following technical parameters:

Length: 
Height: 
Maximum steepness: 56.5 %
Cars: 2
Capacity: 90 passengers per car
Configuration: Single track with passing loop
Travel time: 2.5 minutes
Track gauge: 
Traction: Electrical

Although the line operates two cars, in normal service only one carries passengers, whilst the other simply acts as a counterweight.

The line is operated by the Ferrocarrils de la Generalitat de Catalunya (Catalan Government Railways, FGC), who also operate the Montserrat Rack Railway and the Funicular de Sant Joan funicular railway on Montserrat Mountain, together with two other funicular railways and a significant suburban railway system in and around Barcelona.

The line originally opened in 1929 and was passed to the FGC in 1986. It was renovated in 1991 with the retention of its original stepped and wooden bodied cars. Unfortunately one of these was damaged by floods in 2000, as was the lower station. When the line reopened in 2001, new panoramic cars,  similar to those already in use on the nearby Funicular de Sant Joan, were provided.

References

External links 

Official website of the Montserrat Rack Railway and associated funicular railways (in Catalan, Spanish, English and French)
Photographic description and map of the line from Trens de Catalunya (in Catalan)

Funicular railways in Catalonia
Metre gauge railways in Spain
Transport in Bages